En Total Plenitud (Eng.: "In Total Fullness") is the ninth studio album by Marco Antonio Solís. It was released on 12 October 2010. This album became his tenth number-one set on the Billboard Top Latin Albums for Solís, the most for any artist on the chart. A Dónde Vamos a Parar was featured in the novela Teresa starring Angelique Boyer, Sebastian Rulli, Ana Brenda Contreras, and Aaron Diaz.

Track listing
All songs written and composed by Marco Antonio Solís

Charts

Weekly charts

Year-end charts

Sales and certifications

See also
 List of number-one Billboard Latin Albums from the 2010s

References

External links
Official website
 En Total Plenitud on Amazon.com
 En Total Plenitud on itunes.apple.com
 http://pabloaguirre.net/ns/

2010 albums
Marco Antonio Solís albums
Spanish-language albums
Fonovisa Records albums